Sana Makbul Khan (born Sana Khan; 13 June 1993) is an Indian model and actress. She is best known for her role of Dr. Aliya Sanyal in Colors TV supernatural drama Vish. Makbul made her film debut in 2014 with the Telugu film Dikkulu Choodaku Ramayya. She was seen as a contestant on Fear Factor: Khatron Ke Khiladi 11, where she stood at 7th place.

Early life
Makbul was born as Sana Khan on 13 June 1993 in Mumbai, Maharashta. In 2014, she changed her name to Sana Makbul Khan.

Career 

She began her career in modeling and went on to appear in advertisements and TV shows. She appeared in the reality show MTV Scooty Teen Diva in 2009. She then appeared in the teen musical series Ishaan: Sapno Ko Awaaz De. She was next part of the second season of the TV serial Kitani Mohabbat Hai, after which she played the role of Lavanya Kashyap in the serial Iss Pyaar Ko Kya Naam Doon? and Riya Mukherjee an important role in the 4 Lions Films criminal investigation series Arjun opposite Shaleen Malhotra.

She subsequently participated in Femina Miss India and won the title Femina Miss Beautiful Smile 2012.

In 2014, she made her feature film debut in the Telugu film Dikkulu Choodaku Ramayya, changing her screen name to Sana Makbul. In the film she played the role of Samhitha, an aerobics trainer, with whom a father and son fall in love. She has signed and started filming for the Tamil film, Rangoon, a crime thriller directed by Rajkumar Periasamy.

In 2019 she worked with Vishal Vishishtha in Vish. In 2021, Sana took part in reality TV show Fear Factor: Khatron Ke Khiladi 11 which is filmed in Cape Town, South Africa, she emerged as a semi-finalist.

Filmography

Films

Television

Music videos

References

External links

 
 

1993 births
Living people
Indian television actresses
Indian film actresses
Actresses from Mumbai
Actresses in Telugu cinema
21st-century Indian actresses
Actresses in Tamil cinema
Actresses in Hindi television
Fear Factor: Khatron Ke Khiladi participants